Mark Dean (born June 18, 1980) is an American politician who has served in the West Virginia House of Delegates from the 21st district since 2016.

References

1980 births
Living people
Republican Party members of the West Virginia House of Delegates
21st-century American politicians